The Last Party: Scenes From My Life with Norman Mailer is a 1997 book by Adele Morales, second wife of Norman Mailer, whom she married in 1954. It was published in the US by Barricade Books.

The book is a memoir of Morales' and Mailer's marriage; among other things, it outlines an incident Saturday, November 19, 1960, when Mailer stabbed her with a penknife at a party. He cut through her breast, only just missing her heart. Then he stabbed her in the back. As she lay there, hemorrhaging, one man reached down to help her. He snapped: "Get away from her. Let the bitch die."
He was involuntarily committed to Bellevue Hospital for 17 days; his wife would not press charges, and he later pleaded guilty to a reduced charge of assault, and was given a suspended sentence. Morales was admitted to University Hospital in Manhattan for treatment of her injuries. In the short term, Morales made a partial physical recovery. She divorced Mailer in 1962 as a result of the incident. The stabbing incident has been a focal point for feminist critics of Mailer, who point to themes of sexual violence in his work.

References

External links
 New York Times review

American memoirs
1997 non-fiction books
Domestic violence in the United States
Feminist books